Zenedine Booysen (born ) is a South African rugby union player for the . His regular position is scrum-half.

Booysen was named in the  squad for the 2021 Currie Cup Premier Division.

References

South African rugby union players
Living people
1998 births
Rugby union scrum-halves
Free State Cheetahs players
Cheetahs (rugby union) players
Rugby union players from the Western Cape